Barry John Guy (born 22 April 1947, in London) is an English composer and double bass player. His range of interests encompasses early music, contemporary composition, jazz and improvisation, and he has worked with a wide variety of orchestras in the UK and Europe. He studied at the Guildhall School of Music under Buxton Orr, and later taught there.

Guy came to the fore as an improvising bassist as a member of a trio with pianist Howard Riley and drummer Tony Oxley (Witherden, 1969). He also became an occasional member of John Stevens' ensembles in the 1960s and 1970s, including the Spontaneous Music Ensemble. In the early 1970s, he was a member of the influential free improvisation group Iskra 1903 with Derek Bailey and trombonist Paul Rutherford (a project revived in the late 1970s, with violinist Philipp Wachsmann replacing Bailey). He also formed a long-standing partnership with saxophonist Evan Parker, which led to a trio with drummer Paul Lytton which became one of the best-known and most widely travelled free-improvising groups of the 1980s and 1990s.  He was briefly a member of the Michael Nyman Band in the 1980s, performing on the soundtrack of The Draughtsman's Contract.

Career

London Jazz Composers' Orchestra
Guy's interests in improvisation and formal composition received their grandest form in the London Jazz Composers' Orchestra. Originally formed to perform Guy's composition Ode in 1972 (released as a 2-LP set on Incus and later, in expanded form, as a 2-CD set on Intakt), it became one of the great large-scale European improvising ensembles. Early documentation is spotty – the only other recording from its early years is Stringer (FMP, now available on Intakt paired with the later "Study II") – but, beginning in the late 1980s, the Swiss label Intakt set out to document the band more thoroughly. The result was a series of ambitious, album-length compositions designed to give all the players in the band maximum opportunity for expression, while still preserving a rigorous sense of form: Zurich Concerts (with Anthony Braxton), Harmos, Double Trouble (originally written for an encounter with Alexander von Schlippenbach's Globe Unity Orchestra, though the eventual CD was just for the LJCO), Theoria (a concerto for guest pianist Irène Schweizer), Portraits (a 2-CD set of musical portraits of the band members and their internal groupings), Three Pieces, and Double Trouble Two. The group's activities subsided in the mid-1990s, but it was never formally disbanded, and reconvened in 2008 for a one-off concert in Switzerland. In the mid-1990s Guy also created a second, smaller ensemble, the Barry Guy New Orchestra.

Other activities
Guy has also written for other large improvising ensembles, such as the NOW Orchestra and ROVA (the piece Witch Gong Game inspired by images by the visual artist Alan Davie).

His current improvising activities include piano trios with Marilyn Crispell and Agusti Fernandez. He has also recorded several albums for ECM, which often focus on the interface between improvisers and electronics, including his work in Evan Parker's Electro-Acoustic Ensemble and his own Ceremony.

Guy's session work in the pop field includes playing double bass on the song "Nightporter", from the Japan album Gentlemen Take Polaroids.

He is married to the early music violinist Maya Homburger. After spending some years in Ireland, they now live in Switzerland. They run the small label Maya, which releases a variety of records in the genres of free improvisation, baroque music and contemporary composition.

In 2016, Guy was appointed Honorary Professor at the Rhythmic Music Conservatory (RMC) in Copenhagen, Denmark, where he periodically conducts workshops and master classes.

Style
Guy's jazz work is characterised by free improvisation, using a range of unusual playing methods: bowed and pizzicato sounds beneath the bass's bridge; plucking the strings above the left hand; beating the strings with percussion instrument mallets; and "preparing" the instrument with sticks and other implements inserted between the strings and fingerboard. His improvisations are often percussive and unpredictable, inhabiting no discernible harmonic territory and pushing into unknown regions. However, they can also be melodious and tender with due regard for harmonic integration with other players, and at times he will even play with a straight jazz swing feel.

Similarly, in his concert works, Guy manages to alternate harmonic and rhythmic complexity worthy of 1960s experimentalists such as Penderecki and Stockhausen with joyous, often ecstatic, melody. Works such as "Flagwalk" for string orchestra and "Fallingwater – Concerto for Orchestra" display Guy's compositional skill in handling extended forms and writing for large instrumental groups.

Some of his compositions, such as "Witch Gong Game" for ensemble, use graphic notation in conjunction with cue cards to lead performers into playing and improvising material from numbered sections of the score.

He is also an architect.

Concert works

Orchestra
 Incontri (1970)
 Anna (1974)
 Flagwalk (1974)
 Songs from Tomorrow (1975)
 Voyages of the Moon (1983)
 The Eye of Silence (1988)
 UM 1788 (1989)
 After the Rain (1992)
 Concerto for Orchestra: "Fallingwater" (1996)

Large ensemble (seven or more players)
 Bitz! (1979)
 D (1972)
 Look Up! (1991)
 Play (1976)

Soloists and large ensemble (seven or more players)
 Statements II – Ex (1979)

Works for 2–6 Players
 Bubblets (1998)
 Buzz (1994)
 Eos X (1976)
 The Eye of Silence (1989
 Four Miniatures (1969)
 Games (for All Ages) (1973)
 Mobile Herbarium (1992)
 Pfiff (1979)
 Redshift (1998)
 rondOH! (1985)
 String Quartet No.2 (1970)
 Un Coup de Dés (1994)
 Whistle and Flute (1985)

Solo works (excluding keyboard)
 Celebration (1994)
 Statements II (1972)

Solo voices and up to six players
 Remembered Earth (1992)
 The Road to Ruin (1986)
 String Quartet No.3 (1973)
 Waiata (1980)
 Eos (1978)
 Kingdom (1992)
 No Man's Land (1974)
 Video Life (1986)

Music for film or television
 Breaking the Surface (1986)

Electroacoustic works
 Hold Hands and Sing (1978)

These works are published by Chester Novello, UK, and further information may be found on their Barry Guy page.

Recordings

Solo
Statements V-XI for double bass and violone (1976), Incus 22 – Early solo playing
Assist, Jazz & NOW 4 (1985) – Solos plus a long duo improvisation with Fred Van Hove
Fizzles (1993), Maya MCD 9301 – Solo double bass and chamber bass
Symmetries (2002), Maya MCD 0201 – Solo double bass
Five Fizzles for Samuel Beckett (2014), NoBusiness NBEP 2 – Solo double bass
Irvin's Comet (2020), NoBusiness NBLP 137 – Solo double bass

With John Stevens and Trevor Watts
Withdrawal (1966–67), Emanem 4020 – as Spontaneous Music Ensemble
Prayer for peace (1969), Transatlantic TRA 196/FMRCD96-V0402 – as Amalgam (Guy appears on one track only)
No fear (1977), Spotlite SPJ 556/Hi 4 Head Records HFHCD001
Mining the Seam (1977), Spotlite SPJ 556/Hi 4 Head Records HFHCD003
Application, interaction, and... (1978), Spotlite SPJ 513/Hi 4 Head Records HFHCD002

With Howard Riley
Discussions (1967), Opportunity CP2500
Angle (1968-69), CBS Realm 52669/Sony–Columbia 494433 – with Howard Riley Trio
The Day Will Come (1970), CBS 64077//Sony–Columbia 494434 1970 – with Howard Riley Trio
Flight (1971), Turtle TUR301 – with Howard Riley trio; re-released on FMR in 1995
Synopsis (1973), Incus 13 LP/Emanem 4044 CD – with Howard Riley trio
Overground (1974-75), Emanem 4054 CD – with Howard Riley Trio
Improvisations are forever now (1977) Vinyl VS 113 – with Riley & Wachsmann
Improvisations are forever now (1977-79), Emanem 4070; re-issue of Vinyl LP with extra tracks from 1979 – with Riley & Wachsmann
Endgame (1979), JAPO Records 60028 – with Riley, John Stevens and Trevor Watts
Facets (1979), Impetus 38002 – with Riley and John Stevens
Organic (1979), Jazzprint JPVP115 – with Riley and John Stevens

With Bob Downes Open Music
Diversions (1969), Openian 001
Hell's angels (1970), BDOM 003

With Tony Oxley
Die jazz werkstatt (1970), NDR – on "Saturnalia" by Tony Oxley
Ichnos (1971), RCA Victor SF 8215 – with Tony Oxley Group
Tony Oxley (1972), Incus 8
February Papers (1977), Incus 18  
Tomorrow is here (1985), Dossier ST 7507 – with the Tony Oxley Celebration Orchestra

With Iskra 1903
Buzz Soundtrack (1970-71), Emanem – with Paul Rutherford and Derek Bailey 
Iskra 1903 (1972), Incus – with Rutherford and BaileyReissued as Chapter One 1970-1972 (Emanem, 2000) with additional material
Goldsmiths (1972), Emanem – with Rutherford and Bailey
Free improvisation (1973), Deutsche Grammophon 2740 105 – three-record set with one record devoted to Iskra 1903
Chapter Two 1981-3 (1981-3), Emanem – with Rutherford and Phil Wachsmann
South on the Northern (1988-9), Emanem – with Rutherford and Wachsmann
Frankfurt 1991 (1991), Emanem – with Rutherford and Wachsmann
Iskra Nckpa 1903 (1992), Maya Recordings 9502 – with Rutherford and Wachsmann

With Iskra 1912
Sequences 72 & 73 (1972-4), Emanem 4018

With Barre Phillips
Jazz workshop 71 (1971), NDR TV – on "Whoop" and "La Palette" by Barre Phillips
For all it is (1971) – with Phillips, J.F.Jenny-Clarke, Danielson and Martin (Four basses & percussion)
Bass duets (1981), FMP CD 102 – Peter Kowald duos with Barre Phillips, Barry Guy, Maarten Altena
Arcus (1989), Maya MCD 9101 – double bass duets with Barre Phillips

With London Jazz Composers' Orchestra
Ode (1972), Incus  
Study II/Stringer (1980–91), Intakt CD095
Stringer (1984), SAJ–41
Zurich Concerts (1987–88), Intakt 005 - with Anthony Braxton
Harmos (1989), Intakt CD013
Double Trouble (1990), Intakt CD019
Theoria (1991), Intakt CD024 - with Irène Schweizer
Portraits (1993), Intakt CD 035
Three Pieces for Orchestra (1995), Intakt CD 045 - feat. Marilyn Crispell & Maggie Nicols
Double Trouble Two (1998), Intakt CD 053
Radio Rondo/Schaffhausen Concert (2009), Intakt CD 158
That Time (2020), Not Two MW1001-2 (recorded 1972 and 1980)

With the Barry Guy New Orchestra
Inscape–Tableaux (2000), Intakt CD 066
Oort–Entropy (2004), Intakt CD 101

With Evan Parker
4,4,4 (1980), View VS 0011/Konnex CD – with Parker, Paul Rutherford, and John Stevens
Incision (1981), FMP SAJ-35 – Duo with Evan Parker
Tracks (1983), Incus 42 – with Parker and Lytton
Tai kyoku (1985), Jazz & NOW 3 – Duo with Parker
To whom it may concern (1985), Allelopathy ALL-1 – Two quartets including Parker
Hook, Drift and Shuffle (1985), Incus 45 LP/psi 07.07 CD – with Parker, George Lewis, and Paul Lytton
Atlanta (1986), Impetus IMP 18617 – trio with Parker and Paul Lytton
Supersession (1988), Matchless MR17 – with Parker, Keith Rowe, and Eddie Prévost
Birmingham concert (1993), Rare Music RM026 – with Parker, Paul Dunmall, Tony Levin
50th Birthday Concert (1994), Leo Records CD LR 212/213
Imaginary Values (1994), Maya MCD 9401 – with Parker and Lytton
Bush Fire (1995), Ogun OGCD 009 – with Parker, Louis Moholo, Pule Pheto, Gibo Pheto
Breaths and Heartbeats (1995), Rastascan BRD 019 – with Parker and Lytton
The Redwood Session (1995), CIMP 101 – with Parker and Lytton
Obliquities (1995), Maya 9501 – Duo with Parker
Natives and Aliens (1996), Leo CD LR 243 – Evan Parker trio with Marilyn Crispell
Toward the Margins (1996), ECM New series 1612 – The Evan Parker Electro-Acoustic Ensemble
At the Vortex (1996), Emanem 4022 – with Parker and Lytton
Dividuality (1997), Maya MCD0101 – with Parker and Lawrence Casserley
At Les Instants Chavirés (1997), psi 02.06 – with Parker and Lytton
Drawn Inward (1998), ECM 1693 – The Evan Parker Electro-Acoustic Ensemble
After Appleby (1999), Leo CD LR 283/284 – Evan Parker trio with Marilyn Crispell
2X3=5 (1999), Leo CD LR 305 – with Parker and Lytton, plus the Schlippenbach Trio
Memory/Vision (2002), ECM – The Evan Parker Electro-Acoustic Ensemble
Birds and Blades (2003), Intakt 080 – Duo with Parker
Boustrophedon (2004), ECM – Evan Parker and the Transatlantic Art Ensemble
Free zone Appleby 2004 (2004), psi 05.05 – with Paul Lytton, Joel Ryan, Philipp Wachsmann
Zafiro (2006), Maya Recordings MCD0602 – with Parker and Lytton
The Moment's Energy (2007), ECM – The Evan Parker Electro-Acoustic Ensemble
Topos (2007), Maya Recordings MCD 0701 – with Parker, Fernandez and Lytton

With Mats Gustafsson
Mouth eating trees and related activities (1992), Okka Disk OD12010 – with Lovens
You Forget to Answer (1994-95), Maya MCD 9601 – with Raymond Strid
Gryffgryffgryffs (1996), Music & Arts CD-1003 – with Strid, Crispell
Frogging (1997), Maya MCD 9702 – Duo with Gustafsson
Hidros one (1997), Caprice 21566 
Tarfala (2008), Maya Recordings MCD0801 – with Strid

With Marilyn Crispell
Cascades (1993), Music and Arts 853
Odyssey (1999), Intakt CD 070 – with Paul Lytton
Ithaca (2003), Intakt CD 096 – with Paul Lytton
Phases of the Night (2008), Intakt CD 138 – with Paul Lytton
Deep Memory (2016), Intakt CD 273 – with Paul Lytton

With Maya Homburger
Ceremony (1997), ECM New series 1643 
Celebration (2001), Auditorium AUD 01203 – with Walter Prati
J.S. Bach/Barry Guy (2002), Maya MCD 0301 – (Guy does not play on this CD)
Dakryon (2004), Maya MCD 0501 – with Pierre Favre

With others
Pisa 1980: Improvisors' Symposium (1980), Incus 37 (LP)/psi 04.03/4 (CD)
Long on Dossier (1980), ST 7529 – Single track on Jon Rose LP
Paintings (1981), FMP 0960 – Bass duos with Peter Kowald
IRCAM, un portrait (1983), IRCAM 001/1983 – Barry Guy/Jane Manning, Soft Morning City (Machover)
Re Touch (1983), View VS0025 – Allan Holdsworth/Jeff Young/Barry Guy/Ron Mathewson/John Stevens
Machover, American Contemporary (1984), CRI SD 506 – Ensemble contemporain with Jane Manning & Barry Guy
Play with light and shade (1990), SLAMCD 402 – Duo with Vanessa Mackness on compilation CD
Nailed (1990), FMP CD 108 – Cecil Taylor: The Quartet
Melancholy (1990), FMP CD 104 – Cecil Taylor Workshop Ensemble
Elsie Jo live (1991), Maya MCD 9201 – with Irène Schweizer, Evan Parker, Konrad Bauer, Barre Phillips, and Paul Lytton
Meetings (1992), Splasc(h) – Mario Schiano
After the rain (1993), NMC DO13S – Composition by Guy; City of London Sinfonia, conductor Richard Hickox
Vade Mecum (1993), Soul Note 121208 – With Bill Dixon
Vade Mecum II (1993), Soul Note 121211 – With Bill Dixon
1994, Study – Witch Gong Game (1994), Maya MCD 9402 – Barry Guy and the NOW Orchestra 
Nickelsdorf Konfrontation (1995), Silkheart 143 – Joel Futterman-Kidd Jordan Quintet
Sensology (1995), Maya MCD 9701 – Duo with Paul Plimley
The Secret Magritte (1995), Black Saint 120177-2 – Larry Ochs with Lisle Ellis, Barry Guy, Chris Brown, Marilyn Crispell, William Winant, Rova Sax Quartet
Social security (1996), Victo cd043 – Mario Schiano
Extremely Quartet Hat (1996), ART CD 6199 – John Law
Hilliard songbook: new music for voices (1997), ECM New Series 1614/15 – Hilliard Ensemble with Barry Guy bass
Gudira (1998), Nuscope Recordings 1003 – with Robert Dick and Randy Raine-Reusch
Bingo (1998), Victo CD056 – Rova Saxophone Quartet, composition: Witch Gong Game by Barry Guy (Guy does not play)
Sit fast (1998), Virgin Classics 7243 – Fretwork, composition: Buzz by Barry Guy (Guy does not play)
Lux aeterna (2000), ECM 1695 – Thomas and Patrick Demenga, cello; includes composition Redshift by BG (Guy does not play)
Fayka (2001), Enja ENJ-9447 2 – Duos with Mahmoud Turkmani
2 of 2 (2001), SOFA 510 – Tri-Dim + Barry Guy (+ Jim O'Rourke)
Total Music Meeting 2002 (2002), Audiology II, a/l/l 006 – Compilation CD of 11 groups live in Berlin
Grain (2002?), DotDotDot Music 003 – One (very) short solo track on this compilation
November Music 2003 (2003), November Music NM 007 – One track on compilation CD
Gubbröra (2004), psi 04.10 – Sandell/Stackenas/Parker/Guy/Lytton
Brainforest (2004), Intakt CD 107 – Jacques Demierre/Barry Guy/Lucas Niggli
Composition/Improvisation Nos. 1, 2 & 3 (2004), ECM 1872/171 6989 – Roscoe Mitchell and the Transatlantic Art Ensemble
Aurora (2004–06), Maya Recordings MCD0601 – Fernandez/Guy/Lopez
Folio (2005), ECM New series 1931 – with Maya Homburger, Muriel Cantoreggi, and the Münchener Kammerorchester conducted by Christoph Poppen
Open textures (2005), Forward.rec 006 – Carlos Bechegas/Barry Guy
Falkirk (2005), FMRCD168-i0706 – Glasgow Improvisers Orchestra with Barry Guy
Portrait (1972-2006), Intakt CD 123 – Compilation/Celebration of 25 years of Barry Guy's music
Occasional Poems (2015), Not Two MW931-2 – Barry Guy / Ken Vandermark
Grande Casino (2016), Euphorium 064 – EUPHORIUM_freakestra
One For My Baby And One More For The Bass (2018), Euphorium 077 – Oliver Schwerdt/Barry Guy/Günter Sommer

Bibliography
Barry Witherden: "Conversation Pieces", in: Jazz Monthly, April 1969, pp. 8–10 (an article describing Guy's playing style as a member of the Howard Riley Trio of the late 1960s).
Benjamin Dwyer: "An Interview with Barry Guy", in: B. Dwyer: Different Voices. Irish Music and Music in Ireland (Hofheim: Wolke Verlag, 2014), p. 133–142.

References

External links
Maya Recordings The website of Maya Recordings, Maya Homburger and Barry Guy. Featuring articles, biographies, discographies, news & diary, reviews and photogallery.
Short film portrait on Barry Guy and Maya Homburger, shot in their home studio in 2019
Barry Guy's FMP releases
EFI

1947 births
20th-century classical composers
20th-century English composers
21st-century classical composers
Avant-garde jazz musicians
Classical double-bassists
English classical composers
English male classical composers
English double-bassists
Male double-bassists
Free improvisation
Living people
Musicians from London
21st-century double-bassists
20th-century British male musicians
21st-century British male musicians
British male jazz musicians
Spontaneous Music Ensemble members
Incus Records artists
Intakt Records artists
NoBusiness Records artists
Okka Disk artists
Emanem Records artists